Çolpan İlhan (8 August 1936 – 25 July 2014) was a Turkish cinema and theatre actress. In 1998 she was awarded the title of State Artist of Turkey. She acted in more than 300 films and theater plays.

First years
İlhan received her secondary education at Istanbul Kandilli High School for Girls. Later she studied theater at İstanbul Municipal Drama School and painting at State Academy of Istanbul for Fine Arts. With her fellow students from the Academy, she later formed an amateur theater group called "Akademi Tiyatrosu (Academy Theater)" and prepared plays and dramas.

Artistic career
In 1957, she acted in her first film called Kamelyalı Kadın, which was an adaptation to the movies of The Lady of the Camellias. The same year, she acted in her first professional play Sevgili Gölge (Dear Shadow) with Münir Özkul and Uğur Başaran at  Küçük Sahne (Little Scene) Theater. She acted for 3 years in this theater until its disbandment in the same year. She later performed "Tersine Dönen Şemsiye (Inside-out Umbrella)" with Müfit Ofluoğlu and  Sabahattin Kudret Aksal at Oda (Chamber) Theater. Later, she acted with Kent Oyuncuları (City Performers) in the play of Güner Sümer called "Yarın Cumartesi (Tomorrow is Saturday)". She also acted at Kenterler Theater in plays such as "Baharın Sesi (The Sound of Spring)", "Nalınlar (The Pattens)" and "Aptal Kız (The Foolish Girl)". After a while, she made a break in theater with the birth of her only child. Starting from the mid-1960s, she has returned to her acting career with movies and took part in around 300 Turkish films. She played in the movies until the end of 1970s all in the leading roles and then left the cinema industry and concentrated on fashion designing.

State Artist of Turkey
In 1998, she was given the title of "State Artist of Turkey" by the Turkish Ministry of Culture.

Personal life
She was the sister of famous poet and writer Attila İlhan, and the wife of Sadri Alışık, one of the most famous actors of the cinema of Turkey, with whom she stayed married from 1959 until his death in 1995. They had one child, Kerem Alışık, who is also an actor.

She died of a heart attack on 25 July 2014 at her home in Istanbul. She rests besides her husband at the Zincirlikuyu Cemetery, in Istanbul.

Legacy
İlhan was the founder of the Sadri Alışık Cultural Center.

Selected filmography 

 Kamelyalı Kadın (1957)
 Ak Altın (1957) - Halime
 Yaşamak Hakkımdır (1958)
 Bir Şoförün Gizli Defteri (1958)
 Asi Evlat (1958)
 Hayatım Sana Feda (1959)
 Zümrüt (1959) - Feride
 Yalnızlar Rıhtımı (1959) - Kontes Güner
 Şeytan Mayası (1959)
 Kalpaklılar (1959) - Mujgan
 Cumbadan Rumbaya (1961)
 Aşkın Saati Gelince (1961)
 In der Hölle ist noch Platz (1961)
 Allah Cezanı Versin Osman Bey (1961)
 Sepetçioğlu (1961)
 Avare Mustafa (1961) - Hülya
 Sonbahar Yaprakları (1962)
 İkimize Bir Dünya (1962)
 Ver Elini İstanbul (1962)
 Sehirdeki yabanci (1962) - (voice, uncredited)
 Zorla Evlendik (1963) - Nilüfer Sim
 Temem Bilakis (1963)
 Korkusuz Kabadayı (1963) - Alev
 Kamil Abi (1963) - Gülizar
 Bütün Suçumuz Sevmek (1963)
 Barut Fıçısı (1963)
 Ömer the Tourist (1964)
 Şu Kızların Elinden (1964)
 Ahtapotun Kolları (1964)
 Şaka ile Karışık (1965) - Zühre
 Ekmekçi Kadın (1965)
 Seven Kadın Unutmaz (1965)
 Turist Ömer Dümenciler Kralı (1965)
 Zennube (1965) - Necla
 Yankesicinin Aşkı (1965)
 Tamirci Parçası (1965)
 Komşunun Tavuğu (1965)
 Kolejli Kizin Aski (1965)
 Kocamın Nişanlısı (1965)
 Bir Garip Adam (1965)
 Berduş Milyoner (1965)
 ' Sokak Kızı (1966)
 Zehirli Hayat (1966)
 Turist Ömer Almanya'da (1966)
 Siyah Gül (1966)
 Namus Kanla Yazılır (1966) - Nevin
 Kıskanç Kadın (1966)
 Kenar Mahalle (1966)
 Kaderin Cilvesi (1966) - Ayse
 İdam Mahkumu (1966)
 El Kızı (1966)
 Boyacı (1966)
 Allahaısmarladık (1966)
 Yıkılan Gurur (1967)
 Sinekli Bakkal (1967) - Emine
 Marko Paşa (1967)
 Akşamcı (1967)
 Ağlayan Kadın (1967)
 Ağır Suç (1967)
 Hicran Gecesi (1968) - Sevda
 Cemile (1968)
 Turist Ömer Arabistan'da (1969)
 Sonbahar Rüzgarları (1969) - Kemal's insane wife
 Kaldırım Çiçeği (1969)
 İnleyen Nağmeler (1969)
 İki yetime (1969)
 Günahini ödeyen adam (1969)
 Galatalı Fatma (1969)
 Talihsiz Yavru Fatoş (1970)
 Sezercik yavrum benim (1971)
 Gümüs gerdanlik (1972) - Selma
 Osman Babadan ne hakem (1974) - Zarife Babadan
 Ayyas (1974)
 Aşk-ı Memnu (1974, TV Mini-Series) - Mlle. de Courton
 Seni Kalbime Gömdüm (1982)
 Kiz babasi (1986) - Esnaf
 İlk Aşk (1997, TV Series)
 Ağaçlar Ayakta Ölür (2000, TV Movie)
 The Belly Dancer (2001) - Kobra
 Tatlı Hayat (2001, TV Series) - Feraye
 Green Light (2002)
 Yanık Koza'' (2005) - Esmanur Çelebi (final appearance)

See also
 Cinema of Turkey

References

External links

1936 births
Actresses from İzmir
2014 deaths
Turkish film actresses
Turkish stage actresses
Golden Orange Life Achievement Award winners
20th-century Turkish actresses
State Artists of Turkey
Burials at Zincirlikuyu Cemetery
Balıkesir Lisesi alumni